Pseudochlamys is a genus of warty leaf beetles in the family Chrysomelidae. There is at least one described species in Pseudochlamys, P. semirufescens.

References

Further reading

 
 

Cryptocephalinae
Articles created by Qbugbot
Chrysomelidae genera